The Kompsatos (Sushitsa), also called the Kouroú (Κουρο, Kurú) is a river flowing in Western Thrace, Greece. Its length is 68 kilometers. The river originates from the Rhodope Mountains and flows into Lake Vistonida.

References

Rivers of Greece
Landforms of Rhodope (regional unit)
Rivers of Eastern Macedonia and Thrace